Eppenhuizen is a hamlet in the Dutch province of Groningen. It had a population of around 50 in January 2017.

References

External links 

Het Hogeland
Populated places in Groningen (province)